The Ministry of Transport and Communications (MTC) is a government ministry of Botswana.

History 
It was previously known as Ministry of Works and Transport (Botswana).

See also 

 Ministry of Finance (Botswana)

References

External links
 Ministry of Transport and Communications (MTC)

Government ministries of Botswana
Botswana
Transport organisations based in Botswana